Missouri elected its member August 7, 1826.

See also 
 1826 and 1827 United States House of Representatives elections
 List of United States representatives from Missouri

1826
Missouri
United States House of Representatives